The UBC Sauder School of Business is a faculty at the University of British Columbia. The faculty is located in Vancouver on UBC's Point Grey campus and has a secondary teaching facility at UBC Robson Square downtown. UBC Sauder has been accredited by AACSB since 2003.
The current Dean is Darren Dahl (since 2022), who succeeds Robert Helsley.

History
First established in 1956, the UBC Faculty of Commerce and Business Administration was renamed UBC Sauder School of Business in 2003, in recognition of a donation of a $20 million endowment by William Sauder.

Following a donation from Vancouver business philanthropist Robert H. Lee, the Robert H. Lee Graduate School was established at UBC Sauder in 2006 to support graduate-level education.

In 2012, the UBC Sauder School of Business completed a major renovation to its Henry Angus Building on the UBC campus, adding 55,000 square feet to the original 216,000 square-foot building. The renovation was designed by Acton Ostry Architects and added the Cannacord Learning Commons, Wayne Dean Investment Analysis Centre, and the Bruce Birmingham Undergraduate Centre along with new classrooms and a conference center.

Programs
The UBC Sauder School of Business offers the following programs:

Graduate Programs (Robert H. Lee Graduate School)

Masters of Business Administration (MBA)
Students in UBC Sauder's MBA program choose between one of four career tracks (Technology and analytics leadership; Finance; Product and service management; and, Innovation and entrepreneurship), or build a custom career track. The program culminates with a three-day live-case competition, where students present solutions to real business problems to CEOs and business leaders.

The full-time MBA is 16 months, with intake in August. Part-time MBA, covering the same material as the full-time MBA takes longer, with classes delivered every two to three weekends at the UBC Point Grey campus.

Rankings
UBC Sauder is consistently ranked among the top 100 business schools by organizations such as the Financial Times and The Economist. The MBA program was indexed as the 16th best in North America in the 2015 QS Global 200 Business Schools Report. In 2015, the Financial Times ranked the MBA ranked second among Canadian business schools and in the top 5% of MBA programs worldwide; UBC Sauder was also ranked #1 in North America for “international mobility”, #1 in North America for "international faculty", and #5 in North American for International Students.

The UBC MBA program has also been recognized in the Corporate Knights 2014 Global Green MBA Survey as 2nd in the world for its efforts to integrate sustainability into business education and was listed 23rd by Forbes in its top global business schools report. The school is also a founding member of the Canadian MBA Alliance which was created in 2013. All six members of the alliance rank among the world’s top 100 schools, according to their participation in key rankings – Financial Times, Business Week, and The Economist.

International Masters of Business Administration (IMBA)
The 20-month part-time IMBA, in collaboration with the Antai College of Economics and Management at Shanghai Jiao Tong University, was launched in 2002. The program offers the chance to study part-time in China, and a two-week residency at the UBC Point Grey campus in Vancouver.  The UBC IMBA program has been adapted for the Chinese and Asian markets, and is taught entirely in English by UBC Sauder School of Business professors. IMBA students also conclude their program with a case competition.

Masters of Management (MM)
The Masters of Management is a 9-month pre-experience program, designed for recent graduates looking to complement their bachelor's degree in non-business disciplines. The MM program teaches financial reporting, organizational behaviour, and strategic management in a collaborative environment. Throughout the program, students also receive career development programming, consult for non-for-profit organizations with the Community Business Project, and may participate in study abroad programs. The Masters of Management has been recognized as one of the top 50 Masters of Management degrees in the world by the 2014 Financial Times.

Bachelor + Masters of Management (B+MM) Dual Degree
The Bachelor + Masters of Management Dual Degree program is a program offering both a bachelor's degree and a Master of Management.

PhD in Business Administration 
The PhD in Business Administration is completed through a four-year program at UBC's Sauder School of Business, consisting of two years of coursework followed by a thesis completion and an oral defence.

Undergraduate Program: Bachelor of Commerce (BCom)

UBC Sauder's Bachelor of Commerce offers twelve different specializations: Accounting, Marketing, Real Estate, Finance, International Business, Operations & Logistics, Organizational Behaviour & Human Resources, General Business Management, Business Technology Management, Global Supply Chain and Logistics Management, Entrepreneurship and Business & Computer Science. Students can further choose to add one of four concentrations: Sustainability and Social Impact, Business Analytics, Business Law, or International Business.

Admissions
The minimum required grade point average is 84%. The entering class of 2017 had a mean GPA of 96%.

In the Times Higher Education World University Rankings 2016–2017, UBC Sauder is ranked 1st in Canada and 19th globally for business and economics studies.

In 2020, UBC Sauder had over 5000 applicants for 740 spots for its Bachelor of Commerce program giving the program an applicant to placement percentage of approximately 14.8%.

According to the British Columbia Higher Education Accountability Dataset, UBC Sauder Bcom is the most competitive bachelor program in British Columbia with students residing within British Columbia that put Sauder as their first choice yielding a 40% admittance rate with 52% of them accepting their offer to the program.

This is the acceptance rate for students applying to Sauder from British Columbia from 2012 to 2019 (Out of Province and International Applicants are not included).

The dual undergraduate degree with Sciences Po was a program in which undergraduate students earned a Bachelor of Arts from Sciences Po and a Bachelor of Commerce from the UBC Sauder School of Business in four years. Students spent two years at one of three Sciences Po campuses in France (Le Havre, Menton, or Reims). Then, students enrolled at UBC. Graduates of the program are guaranteed admission to a Sciences Po graduate program. The dual undergraduate degree program with Sciences Po has since been discontinued, with the last intake of students occurring in September 2017.

Post-Baccalaureate Programs
 Diploma in Accounting (DAP)
 Diploma in Marketing & Sales Management

Non-Degree Programs

Portfolio Management Foundation
The Portfolio Management Foundation (PMF) is a two-year extra curricular program that is available to BCom students starting at the end their 2nd year.  The program provides training for students wishing to pursue a career in Capital Markets and also offers students the opportunity to manage a multi-million dollar endowment fund. The program is run by the Dean of Sauder School of Business along with a PMF Board of Directors.

Executive Education
UBC Sauder offers Executive Education with more than 100 seminars and offers custom programs for organizations, which include executive training programs in Asia and Europe. It has partnerships with the Project Management Institute, Edumine and the FRED Scholars (SM) Program. UBC Sauder's Executive Education has been ranked 51st in the world in 2013 by the Financial Times.

Real Estate Division
The Real Estate Division at UBC Sauder is a supplier of online and classroom education services: licensing and mortgage brokerage courses and examinations as well as credit and professional development courses. UBC Sauder offers real estate licensing services on behalf of regulatory bodies in British Columbia like BCREA, PAMA, RECBC, and AIC among others.

All courses are available by distance education and assistance is given to students via webinars, online resources, and email and telephone tutoring.

The Real Estate Division also has a publishing arm, providing print and online publications like real estate textbooks, workbooks, case studies, on-line lectures and custom produced course materials.

Other non-degree programs
 Ch'nook Indigenous Business Programs
 Business Families Centre Programs for Families & Advisors

Research
UBC Sauder consistently ranks in the top 30 – among non-U.S. business schools worldwide – for business research by the Social Science Research Network (SSRN). The SSRN ranks UBC Sauder 16th out of 771 international business schools, not including U.S. schools, for research downloads of all time.

Research Centres
The school is host to 15 specialized research centres.

Notable alumni

 Dean Bosacki, businessman
 Jim Chu, formerly Chief Constable of the Vancouver Police Department
 Yael Cohen, non-profit executive and philanthropist. Founder of Fuck Cancer
 Herb Dhaliwal, businessman, real estate developer and philanthropist
 Lalith Gamage, CEO of Sri Lanka Institute of Information Technology
 Lindsay Gordon, MBA 1976, Former CEO of HSBC Canada
 David Ing, marketing scientist, and senior consultant
 Frank Iacobucci, BCom 1961, Former Puisne Justice, Supreme Court of Canada, and former Dean, University of Toronto's Faculty of Law
 Paul Lee, former President of Electronic Arts
 Robert H. Lee, Chairman Prospero Group, Real Estate Developer, Philanthropist
 Brandt C. Louie, President and CEO of H.Y. Louie Co. Limited, and Chairman of London Drugs Limited.
 Kyle MacDonald, blogger and founder of the One red paperclip website
 Henry McKinnell, CEO and chairman of the board, Pfizer
 John H. McArthur, BCom 1957, Dean Emeritus, Harvard Business School
 Nadir Mohamed, BCom 1978, former CEO, Rogers Communications
 Sarah Morgan-Silvester BCom 1982, Chancellor, University of British Columbia
 Ben Rutledge, BCom 2006, Canadian rower and '08 Olympic gold-medalist
 Gregg Saretsky, MBA 1984, President & CEO, WestJet
 Jim Pattison, CEO of the Jim Pattison Group
Eden Shand, MBA 1968, environmentalist, Trinidad and Tobago Minister of External Affairs and International Trade (1988-1991)
 William Sauder, BCom 1948, Chairman of International Forest Products Ltd. and Sauder Industries
 Peter Todd, PhD, former dean of McGill University's Desautels Faculty of Management, dean of HEC Paris
 John Yap, MBA 1983, Minister of Advance Education and Minister Responsible for Multiculturalism, Province of BC
 Peter Wall, property developer
 Nolan Watson, investor
 Brian Wong, Founder Kiip, internet entrepreneur
Jacki Zehner, BCom 1987, youngest female partner in Goldman Sachs' history

Controversies
In 2013 Commerce Undergraduate Society members faced controversy for participating in a rape chant during the beginning of the school year. The incident made national headlines.

References

External links
 Website

University of British Columbia
Business schools in Canada
1956 establishments in Canada